Operation Goodwood was an offensive operation by the British Army against the German Wehrmacht, which took place between 18 and 20 July 1944 as part of the larger battle for Caen in Normandy, France during the Second World War. 

While Goodwood failed in its primary aim, it forced the Germans to keep powerful formations opposite the British and Canadians on the eastern flank of the Normandy beachhead and Operation Cobra, the First US Army attack which began on 25 July, caused the weaker German defences opposite to collapse.

British Order of Battle

 Second Army
Lieutenant-General Miles Dempsey

 Army troops
 4th Army Group Royal Artillery
 8th Army Group Royal Artillery
  79th Armoured Division (elements)
 Major-General Percy Hobart
 5th Assault Regiment, Royal Engineers (Churchill AVRE)
 22nd Dragoons (Sherman Crab mine flails)
 141st Regiment, Royal Armoured Corps (Churchill Crocodile flamethrower tanks)
 1st Lothians and Border Horse (Sherman Crabs)

  I Corps
 Lieutenant-General John Crocker
 Corps troops
 27th Armoured Brigade
 13th/18th Royal Hussars (Queen Mary's Own)
 1st East Riding Yeomanry
  3rd Infantry Division
 Major-General Lashmer Whistler
 Divisional troops
 3rd (Royal Northumberland Fusiliers) Reconnaissance Regiment, Royal Armoured Corps
 7th, 33rd, 76th Field Regiments, Royal Artillery
 20th Anti Tank Regiment, Royal Artillery
 20th Light Anti Aircraft Regiment, Royal Artillery
 2nd Battalion, Middlesex Regiment (machine gun battalion)
 8th Infantry Brigade
 1st Battalion, Suffolk Regiment
 2nd Battalion, East Yorkshire Regiment
 1st Battalion, South Lancashire Regiment (The Prince of Wales's Volunteers)
 9th Infantry Brigade
 2nd Battalion, Lincolnshire Regiment
 1st Battalion, King's Own Scottish Borderers
 2nd Battalion, Royal Ulster Rifles
 185th Infantry Brigade
 2nd Battalion, Royal Warwickshire Regiment
 1st Battalion, Royal Norfolk Regiment
 2nd Battalion, King's Shropshire Light Infantry
 33rd Armoured Brigade (attached)
 1st Northamptonshire Yeomanry
 Staffordshire Yeomanry
 144th Regiment, Royal Armoured Corps
 148th Regiment, Royal Armoured Corps
  51st (Highland) Infantry Division
 Major-General D.C. Bullen-Smith
 Divisional troops
 2nd Derbyshire Yeomanry (reconnaissance)
 126th, 127th and 128th Field Regiments, Royal Artillery
 61st Anti Tank Regiment, Royal Artillery
 40th Light Anti Aircraft Regiment, Royal Artillery
 1st/7th Battalion, Middlesex Regiment (machine gun battalion)
 152nd (Highland) Infantry Brigade
 2nd Battalion, Seaforth Highlanders
 5th Battalion, Seaforth Highlanders
 5th Battalion, Queen's Own Cameron Highlanders
 153rd Highland Infantry Brigade
 5th Battalion, Black Watch
 1st Battalion, Gordon Highlanders
 5th/7th Battalion, Gordon Highlanders
 154th (Highland) Infantry Brigade
 1st Battalion, Black Watch
 7th Battalion, Black Watch
 7th Battalion, Argyll and Sutherland Highlanders

  VIII Corps
 Lieutenant-General Richard O'Connor
  Guards Armoured Division
 Major-General Allan Henry Shafto Adair
 Divisional troops
 55th and 153rd Field Regiments, Royal Artillery
 21st Anti Tank Regiment, Royal Artillery
 94th Light Anti Aircraft Regiment, Royal Artillery
 2nd Battalion, Welsh Guards (armoured reconnaissance)
 5th Guards Armoured Brigade
 2nd (Armoured) Battalion, Grenadier Guards
 1st (Armoured) Battalion, Coldstream Guards
 2nd (Armoured) Battalion, Irish Guards
 1st (Motor) Battalion, Grenadier Guards
 32nd Guards Infantry Brigade
 5th Battalion, Coldstream Guards
 3rd Battalion, Irish Guards
 1st Battalion, Welsh Guards
  7th Armoured Division
 Major-General George Erskine
 Divisional troops
 8th King's Royal Irish Hussars (reconnaissance)
 3rd Regiment, Royal Horse Artillery
 5th Regiment, Royal Horse Artillery
 65th Anti Tank Regiment, Royal Artillery
 15th Light Anti Aircraft Regiment, Royal Artillery
 22nd Armoured Brigade
 1st Royal Tank Regiment
 5th Royal Tank Regiment
 4th County of London Yeomanry (Sharpshooters)
 1st Battalion, Rifle Brigade
 131st (Queens) Infantry Brigade
 1st/5th Battalion, Queen's Royal Regiment (West Surrey)
 1st/6th Battalion, Queen's Royal Regiment (West Surrey)
 1st/7th Battalion, Queen's Royal Regiment (West Surrey)
  11th Armoured Division
 Major-General George "Pip" Roberts
 Divisional troops
 2nd Northamptonshire Yeomanry (reconnaissance)
 The Inns of Court Regiment (reconnaissance; attached)
 13th Regiment, Royal Horse Artillery (Honourable Artillery Company)
 151st Field Regiment, Royal Artillery
 75th Anti Tank Regiment, Royal Artillery
 58th Light Anti Aircraft Regiment, Royal Artillery
 29th Armoured Brigade
 23rd Hussars
 3rd Royal Tank Regiment
 2nd Fife and Forfar Yeomanry
 8th Battalion, Rifle Brigade
 159th Infantry Brigade
 4th Battalion, King's Shropshire Light Infantry
 3rd Battalion, Monmouthshire Regiment
 1st Battalion, Herefordshire Regiment

German Order of Battle 
Panzer Group West
General der Panzertruppe Heinrich Eberbach

 I SS Panzer Corps
 SS-Obergruppenführer Josef "Sepp" Dietrich
 Corps troops
 101st SS Heavy Panzer Battalion
 101st SS Artillery Battalion
 7th Werfer Brigade
 83rd and 84th Werfer Regiments
 1st SS Panzer Division Leibstandarte SS Adolf Hitler
 SS-Obergruppenführer Theodor Wisch
 1st SS Panzer Regiment
 1st SS Reconnaissance Battalion
 1st SS Panzergrenadier Regiment
 2nd SS Panzergrenadier Regiment
 1st SS Artillery Regiment
 12th SS Panzer Division Hitlerjugend 
 SS-Brigadeführer Kurt Meyer
 12th SS Panzer Regiment
 12th SS Reconnaissance Battalion
 25th SS Panzergrenadier Regiment
 26th SS Panzergrenadier Regiment
 12th SS Artillery Regiment
 272nd Infantry Division
 Major General Friedrich Schack
 980th Infantry Regiment
 981st Infantry Regiment
 982nd Infantry Regiment
 272nd Reconnaissance Battalion
 272nd Artillery Regiment
 272nd Anti Tank Battalion

 LXXXVI Corps
 General der Infanterie Hans von Obstfelder
 Corps troops
 503rd Heavy Panzer Battalion
 9th Werfer Brigade
 14th and 54th Werfer Regiments
 555th, 763rd, 1151st and 1193rd Artillery Battalions
 1255th Heavy Coastal Artillery Battalion
 1039th and 1053rd Anti Tank Battalions
 725th Railway Artillery Battalion
 16th Luftwaffe Field Division
 Major General Karl Sievers
 31st Rifle Regiment
 32nd Rifle Regiment
 46th Rifle Regiment
 16th Luftwaffe Artillery Regiment
 16th Luftwaffe Anti Tank Battalion
 21st Panzer Division
 Brigadier General Edgar Feuchtinger
 22nd Panzer Regiment
 125th Panzergrenadier Regiment
 192nd Panzergrenadier Regiment
 21st Reconnaissance Battalion
 155th Artillery Regiment
 200th Assault Gun Battalion
 346th Infantry Division
 Major General Erich Straube
 857th Infantry Regiment
 858th Infantry Regiment
 346th Reconnaissance Battalion
 346th Artillery Regiment
 346th Anti Tank Battalion
 711th Infantry Division
 Major General Josef Reichert
 731st Infantry Regiment
 744th Infantry Regiment
 711th Anti Tank Company
 1711th Artillery Regiment

See also

List of orders of battle

Footnotes

Bibliography

Goodwood, Operation
Goodwood, Operation
Goodwood, Operation
Goodwood
Goodwood, Operation